Finlandization is the process by which one powerful country makes a smaller neighboring country refrain from opposing the former's foreign policy rules, while allowing it to keep its nominal independence and its own political system. The term means "to become like Finland", referring to the influence of the Soviet Union on Finland's policies during the Cold War.

The term is often considered pejorative. It originated in the West German political debate of the late 1960s and 1970s. As the term was used in West Germany and other NATO countries, it referred to the decision of a country not to challenge a more powerful neighbour in foreign politics, while maintaining national sovereignty.  It is commonly used in reference to Finland's policies in relation to the Soviet Union during the Cold War, but it can refer more generally to similar international relations, such as Denmark's attitude toward Germany between 1871 and 1940, or the policies of the Swiss government towards Nazi Germany until the end of World War II.

Origin and international usage 

In Germany, the term was used mainly by proponents of closer adaptation to US policies, chiefly Franz Josef Strauss, but was initially coined in scholarly debate, and made known by the German political scientists Walter Hallstein and Richard Löwenthal, reflecting feared effects of withdrawal of US troops from Germany. It came to be used in the debate of the NATO countries in response to Willy Brandt's attempts to normalise relations with East Germany, and the following widespread scepticism in Germany against NATO's Dual-Track Decision. Later, after the fall of the Soviet Union, the term has been used in Finland for the post-1968 radicalisation in the latter half of the Urho Kekkonen era.

In the 1990s, Finlandization was also discussed as a potential strategy that the Soviet Union under Gorbachev may have attempted to revise its relationship with the Warsaw Pact states from 1989 to 1991, as a way to transition from informal empire to a looser sphere of influence model, which was precluded by the fall of the USSR.

United States foreign policy experts consistently feared that Western Europe and Japan would be Finlandized by the Soviet Union, leading to a situation in which these key allies would no longer support the United States against the Soviet Union. The theory of bandwagoning provided support for the idea that if the United States was not able to provide strong and credible support for the anti-communist positions of its allies, NATO and the U.S.–Japan alliance could collapse.

The term has also been used in discussing other countries, for example as a potential outcome of the Russo-Ukrainian War.

Finnish perception

Finns have, and had, a wide variety of reactions to the term "Finlandization". Some have perceived the term as blunt criticism, stemming from an inability to understand the practicalities of how a small nation needs to deal with an adjacent superpower without losing its sovereignty. These practicalities existed primarily because of the lingering effect of Russian rule in the time before the Finns first gained sovereignty; and because of the precarious power balance eastwards, springing from a geographically extended yet sparsely populated state with a traditionally imperialist superpower right across the border.

The reason Finland engaged in Finlandization was primarily Realpolitik: to survive. On the other hand, the threat of the Soviet Union was used also in Finland's domestic politics in a way that possibly deepened Finlandization (playing the so-called ). Finland made such a deal with Joseph Stalin's government in the late 1940s, and it was largely respected by both parties—and to the gain of both parties—until the fall of the Soviet Union in 1991. While the Finnish political and intellectual elite mostly understood the term to refer more to the foreign policy problems of other countries, and meant mostly for domestic consumption in the speaker's own country, many ordinary Finns considered the term highly offensive. The Finnish political cartoonist Kari Suomalainen once explained Finlandization as "the art of bowing to the East without mooning the West".

Historical background
Finland's foreign politics before this deal had been varied: independence from Imperial Russia with support of Imperial Germany in 1917; participation in the Russian Civil War (without official declaration of war) alongside the Triple Entente 1918–1920; a non-ratified alliance with Poland in 1922; association with the neutralist and democratic Scandinavian countries in the 1930s ended by the Winter War (1939) which ended in the Soviet Union's pyrrhic victory; and finally in 1940, a rapprochement with Nazi Germany, the only power able and willing to help Finland against the expansionist Soviet Union, which led to Finland's re-entry into the Second World War in 1941.

The Wehrmacht's defeat in the Battle of Stalingrad led Finland to basically revert to its 19th-century traditions, which had been perceived as highly successful until the Russification of Finland (1899–1905).  Finland's leaders realised that opposing the Soviets head-on was no longer feasible. No international power was able to give the necessary support. Nazi Germany, Finland's chief supporter against Russia, was losing the war. Sweden was not big enough, and its leadership was wary of confronting Russia. The western powers were allied with the Soviet Union. Thus Finland had to face its bigger neighbour on its own, without any great power's protection. As in the 19th century, Finland chose not to challenge Soviet Russia's foreign policy, but exerted caution to keep its independence.

Paasikivi doctrine

After the Paris Peace Treaty of 1947, Finland succeeded in retaining democracy and parliamentarism, despite the heavy political pressure on Finland's foreign and internal affairs by the Soviet Union. Finland's foreign relations were guided by the doctrine formulated by Juho Kusti Paasikivi, emphasising the necessity to maintain a good and trusting relationship with the Soviet Union.

Finland signed an Agreement of Friendship, Cooperation, and Mutual Assistance with the Soviet Union in April 1948, under which Finland was obliged to resist armed attacks by "Germany or its allies" against Finland, or against the Soviet Union through Finland, and, if necessary, ask for Soviet military aid to do so. At the same time, the agreement recognised Finland's desire to remain outside great power conflicts, allowing the country to adopt a policy of neutrality during the Cold War.

As a consequence, Finland did not participate in the Marshall Plan and took neutral positions on Soviet overseas initiatives. By keeping very cool relations to NATO and western military powers in general, Finland could fend off Soviet pressure for affiliation to the Warsaw Pact.

Self-censorship and excessive Soviet adaptation

From the political scene following the post-1968 radicalisation, the Soviet adaptation spread to the editors of mass media, sparking strong forms of self-control, self-censorship and pro-Soviet attitudes. Most of the elite of media and politics shifted their attitudes to match the values that the Soviets were thought to favor and approve. 

Only after the ascent of Mikhail Gorbachev to Soviet leadership in 1985 did mass media in Finland gradually begin to criticise the Soviet Union more. When the Soviet Union allowed non-communist governments to take power in Eastern Europe, Gorbachev suggested they could look to Finland as an example to follow.

Censorship 
Between 1944 and 1946, the Soviet part of the allied control commission demanded that Finnish public libraries should remove from circulation more than 1,700 books that were deemed anti-Soviet, and bookstores were given catalogs of banned books. The Finnish Board of Film Classification likewise banned movies that it considered to be anti-Soviet. Banned movies included One, Two, Three (1961), directed by Billy Wilder, The Manchurian Candidate (1962), directed by John Frankenheimer, One Day in the Life of Ivan Denisovich (1970), by Finnish director Caspar Wrede, and Born American (1986), by Finnish director Renny Harlin.

The censorship never took the form of purging. Possession or use of anti-Soviet books was not banned, but the reprinting and distribution of such materials was prohibited. Especially in the realm of radio and television self-censorship, it was sometimes hard to tell whether the motivations were even political. For example, once a system of blacklisting recordings had been introduced, individual policy makers within the national broadcaster, Yleisradio, also utilized it to censor songs they deemed inappropriate for other reasons, such as some of those featuring sexual innuendo or references to alcohol.

See also 

 Appeasement
 Balkanization
 Finland–Russia relations
 Finnish Security Intelligence Service
 
 Note Crisis
 Sadae
 Satellite state
 Soviet Empire

Notes

External links 
 "Finland's Relations with the Soviet Union, 1940–1986" by Peter Botticelli
 Finlandization" in action: Helsinki's experience with Moscow"  presented at the Web site of the CIA
 "Three Cheers for Balkanization!" by Bruce Walker, re-evaluating the Finlandization concept
 The Silenced Media: The Propaganda War Between Russia and the West in Northern Europe—review by Jussi M. Hanhimäki of a book by Esko Salminen
 "The Silent Estate?" —review by David McDuff of the same book by Esko Salminen
 A tale of polar diplomacy and suppressed sorrow: The end of an era for Finland and the world

Cold War terminology
Ethically disputed political practices
Finland–Russia relations
Finland–Soviet Union relations
Foreign relations of the Soviet Union
Former client states
Former vassal states
Metaphors referring to places
Political history of Finland
Political terminology
Politics of Finland
Power (international relations)
1960s neologisms
Film controversies in Finland
Film censorship in Finland